Serhiy Valyayev (born 16 September 1978 in Makiivka, Ukraine) is a retired Ukrainian football midfielder and manager.

Club career
Valyayev become one of several footballers that were bought by Metalist Kharkiv in 2005 by the new manager Myron Markevych. Since then, the team has won three bronze titles in the Ukrainian championship.

International career
Valyayev was called up to the national team of Ukraine when Metalist Kharkiv began having successes in UEFA Cup, finishing on top of their group. He was called up along with fellow team-mates Marko Dević and Valentyn Slyusar by Oleksiy Mykhailychenko for a friendly match against Norway on 19 November 2008. His second appearance for the team was significant, as he scored the opening goal in the tenth minute of a friendly match against Cyprus on 10 February 2009.

References

External links
Profile on Official Metalist website 

Ukrainian footballers
Ukraine international footballers
1978 births
Living people
Sportspeople from Makiivka
Ukrainian Premier League players
FC Shakhtar Makiivka players
FC Metalist Kharkiv players
FC Kryvbas Kryvyi Rih players
FC Dnipro players
FC Hoverla Uzhhorod players
FC Arsenal Kyiv players
FC Helios Kharkiv players
Ukrainian football managers
FC Nikopol managers
FC Metalist 1925 Kharkiv managers
FC Krystal Kherson managers
Association football midfielders